North Calgary was a provincial electoral district in Calgary, Alberta, Canada, mandated to return a single member to the Legislative Assembly of Alberta using the first past the post method of voting from 1913 to 1921.

North Calgary history

Boundary history

Electoral history
The electoral district was created in 1913 as part of a contentious boundary redistribution that saw the Calgary provincial electoral district broken up into three single member constituencies, the other two being South Calgary and Centre Calgary. Conservative candidates won all three districts that year on a wave of anti Liberal support in the city as electors were unhappy with Premier Arthur Sifton.

Calgary North would swing to the Liberal column in the 1917 general election as incumbent Samuel Hillocks was defeated by star candidate journalist William Davidson. The electoral district would be abolished in 1921 as Calgary was reconstituted into a five-member district.

Election results

1913 general election

1917 general election

See also
List of Alberta provincial electoral districts

References

Further reading

External links
Elections Alberta
The Legislative Assembly of Alberta

Politics of Calgary
Former provincial electoral districts of Alberta